The Hidden Way is a surviving 1926 American silent crime drama film produced and directed by Joseph De Grasse, written by his wife Ida May Park and starring Mary Carr, Gloria Grey and Thomas Santschi. The film was lost for decades until a print surfaced in near mint condition in New Zealand.

Cast
Mary Carr as Mother
Gloria Grey as Mary
Thomas Santschi as Bill
Arthur Rankin as Harry
Ned Sparks as Mulligan
Jane Thomas as The Woman
Billie Jeane Phelps as The Child
Wilbur Mack as Sid Atkins
William Ryno as Samuel Atkins

References

External links
The Hidden Way at IMDb.com

1926 films
American silent feature films
American black-and-white films
Films directed by Joseph De Grasse
American crime drama films
1926 crime drama films
Associated Exhibitors films
1920s American films
Silent American drama films